Robert T. Hohler (born October 23, 1951) is an investigative sports reporter for The Boston Globe ("The Globe").  He also writes in-depth news stories ("enterprise reporting") for The Globe.  Hohler was The Globe's Boston Red Sox beat reporter during their 2004 championship run.

Background and career
Hohler is native of Boston, and a graduate of Suffolk University.  He worked at the Monadnock Ledger, and then at the Concord Monitor beginning in 1983.  While a columnist at the Concord Monitor, he wrote the book, I Touch the Future: The Story of Christa McAuliffe, which describes the life of New Hampshire teacher Christa McAuliffe who died aboard the space shuttle in 1986.

He subsequently joined The Globe in 1987 as a political reporter, including work from 1993 to 2000 at the Globe’s Washington bureau.  From 2000 to 2004, he was the beat writer for the Boston Red Sox, including for the 2004 run in which the team captured their first championship since 1918.  He stated that covering the Red Sox "was the greatest challenge of [his] career.”  

Hohler authored a seven-part series chronicling the poorly-funded athletics programs of the Boston Public Schools.

Awards
1985 Associated Press Feature Work Award
2007 Salute to Excellence Award from the National Association of Black Journalists
2009 Fred M. Hechinger Grand Prize for Distinguished Education Reporting, for Failing Our Athletes: The Sad State of Sports in Boston Public Schools.
2010 Dick Schaap Award for Outstanding Journalism
2010 Award for Excellence in Coverage of Youth Sports, presented by the John Curley Center for Sports Journalism at Penn State, for his series "Failing our Athletes," about the plight of athletic programs and student-athletes in Boston public schools.

Works
 I touch the future: the story of Christa McAuliffe, author (Random House, 1986)
 The Best American Sports Writing 2007, contributor (Houghton Mifflin, 2007 )

References

Living people
1951 births
American investigative journalists
The Boston Globe people
Suffolk University alumni